Beat TV (known as The Beat of London in Australia) is a daily entertainment show broadcast on ITV2. Hosted by Darren McMullen, Laura Whitmore and Dave Berry, the show broadcast for 30 minutes live each weeknight of the 2012 Summer Olympics celebrating a more social side to the games. Each night two celebrity guests appeared, with musical performances from the latest artists.

Episode Guide

2012 British television series debuts
2012 British television series endings
ITV (TV network) original programming
Television series by ITV Studios